The Principality of Andorra's honours system started developing very recently and it is still in development.

History
The Principality of Andorra started development of an honours system in 2007, through the Consolidation Decree 12-09-2007 and the implementation Ministerial Decree 07-12-2007, with the creation of the Order of Charlemagne amongst the Charlemagne Prizes.

With the following years, the Andorran honours system was expanded in 2011 by the Inter-Parish Commission with the creation of the medals and awards for the City Guards of the country, adopted by Decree by all the Parishes.

This system, with many mistakes committed during its application, was reformed by the Andorran phalerist Adrià Espineta Arias through a technical report that was implemented in 2015 and changed the protocol and designs of most of the awards.  Consequently, during late 2015 and early 2016, the reviewed and adapted Decrees were approved by all Parishes implementing the reforms and producing the first award ceremony in May 2016.

On the other hand, since 2013 the Andorran Fire Brigade is currently awarding a 25 years of Service Medal which remains unregulated.

Order of precedence
Orders
 Order of Charlemagne

Medals and decorations

 City Guards Cross of Professional Merit
 City Guards Medal for 25 years of Service
 City Guards Medal for 20 years of Service
 City Guards Medal for 15 years of Service
 Medal for 25 years of Service in Canillo
 Medal for 25 years of Service in Encamp
 Medal for 25 years of Service in Ordino
 Medal for 25 years of Service in La Massana
 Medal for 25 years of Service in Andorra la Vella
 Medal for 25 years of Service in Sant Julià de Lòria
 Medal for 25 years of Service in Escaldes-Engordany
 Medal for 25 years of Service at the Fire Brigade of the Principality of Andorra

References
Specific

General
  (Consolidation Decree 12-09-2007 of the Charlemagne Prizes, comprising the ‘’Order of Charlemagne’’)
  (Ministerial Decree 07-12-2007 creating the ‘’Order of Charlemagne’’ amongst the ‘’Charlemagne Prizes’’)
  (Decree 05-08-2011 of Andorra la Vella creating the medals and awards for the Parish City Guards; each Parish created its own regulation)
  (Decree 02-11-2015 of Andorra la Vella reforming the previous regulations on the medals and awards for the Parish City Guards; again, each Parish published its own reformed legal texts)
 Ribbon bars of Andorra and order of precedence.

 
Andorra